The 2020 Pacific hurricane season was an event in the annual cycle of tropical cyclone formation, in which tropical cyclones form in the Eastern Pacific Ocean. The season officially started on May 15 in the Eastern Pacific—east of 140°W—and began on June 1 in the Central Pacific—the region between the International Date Line and 140°W–and ended on November 30. These dates typically cover the period of each year when most tropical cyclones form in the Eastern Pacific basin according to the National Hurricane Center. However, tropical cyclones sometimes form outside the bounds of an official season, as was evidenced by the formation of Tropical Depression One-E  on April 25. The season ended with the dissipation of its final storm, Tropical Storm Polo, on November 19.

The formation of One-E on April 25 marked the earliest start to a Pacific hurricane season on record. However, seasonal activity as a whole was generally below average. The season featured 16 named storms, in line with the 1981–2010 long-term average of 15. It featured just four hurricanes, or half the average. Three of those hurricanes intensified into major hurricanes, which compares to the average of four. A few storms produced substantial impact to land in 2020. In May, Tropical Storm Amanda caused widespread damage and killed numerous people in El Salvador, Guatemala, and Honduras. In August, the remnants of Tropical Storm Fausto sparked devastating wildfires across Northern California, while Genevieve produced hurricane-force winds and caused additional fatalities in the Baja California peninsula. Lesser but still deadly effects were produced there by Tropical Storm Hernan as well. A month prior, Hurricane Douglas passed very close to Oahu, though it caused only minor impact.

This timeline documents tropical cyclone formations, strengthening, weakening, landfalls, extratropical transitions, and dissipations during the season. It includes information that was not released throughout the season, meaning that data from post-storm reviews by the National Hurricane Center, such as a storm that was not initially warned upon, has been included.

By convention, meteorologists use one time zone when issuing forecasts and making observations: Coordinated Universal Time (UTC), and also use the 24-hour clock (where 00:00 = midnight UTC). Tropical cyclone advisories in the Eastern North Pacific basin use both UTC and the nautical time zone where the center of the tropical cyclone is currently located. Time zones utilized (east to west) are: Central, Mountain, Pacific and Hawaii. In this timeline, all information is listed by UTC first, with the respective regional time zone included in parentheses. Additionally, figures for maximum sustained winds and position estimates are rounded to the nearest 5 units (knots, miles, or kilometers), following National Hurricane Center practice. Direct wind observations are rounded to the nearest whole number. Atmospheric pressures are listed to the nearest millibar and nearest hundredth of an inch of mercury.

Timeline

April

April 25
06:00 UTC (11:00 p.m.

April 26
12:00 UTC (5:00 a.m.

May

May 15
The 2022 Pacific hurricane season officially begins in the East Pacific.

May 30
18:00 UTC (1:00 p.m.

May 31
06:00 UTC (1:00 a.m.
10:00 UTC (5:00 a.m. CDT) at  Tropical Storm Amanda makes landfall near Las Lisas, Guatemala, with winds of 40 mph (65 km/h).
18:00 UTC (1:00 p.m. CDT) at  Tropical Storm Amanda dissipates about 100 mi (165 km) north-northeast of Guatemala City, Guatemala. Its remnants lead to the formation of Tropical Storm Cristobal in the Gulf of Mexico.

June

June 1
 The season in the Central Pacific officially begins.

June 24
06:00 UTC (8:00 p.m.

June 25
18:00 UTC (8:00 a.m. HST) at  Tropical Depression Three-E strengthens into Tropical Storm Boris about 1,330 mi (2,145 km) east-southeast of Hilo, Hawaii.

June 26
06:00 UTC (8:00 p.m. HST, June 25) at  Tropical Storm Boris weakens into a tropical depression about 1,235 mi (1,990 km) east-southeast of Hilo, Hawaii.

June 28
00:00 UTC (2:00 p.m. HST, June 27) at  Tropical Depression Boris degenerates to a remnant low about 1,015 mi (1,635 km) east-southeast of Hilo, Hawaii.

June 29
18:00 UTC (12:00 p.m.

June 30
18:00 UTC (12:00 p.m. MDT) at  Tropical Depression Four-E degenerates to a remnant low about 235 mi (380 km) southwest of the southern tip of the Baja California peninsula.

July

July 6
18:00 UTC (1:00 p.m.

July 7
06:00 UTC (1:00 a.m.

July 10
18:00 UTC (1:00 p.m.

July 12
18:00 UTC (11:00 a.m.

July 13
12:00 UTC (6:00 a.m.

July 14
18:00 UTC (11:00 a.m.

July 20
00:00 UTC (5:00 p.m.
00:00 UTC (5:00 p.m.
18:00 UTC (11:00 a.m.

July 22
18:00 UTC (11:00 a.m. PDT) at  Tropical Storm Douglas intensifies into a Category 1 hurricane about midway between the coastline of southwestern Mexico and Hawaii.

July 23
06:00 UTC (11:00 p.m.

July 24
00:00 UTC (5:00 p.m.
12:00 UTC (2:00 a.m.

July 25
06:00 UTC (8:00 p.m.

July 26
00:00 UTC (2:00 p.m.

July 28
00:00 UTC (2:00 p.m.

July 29
12:00 UTC (2:00 a.m.

August
August 8
18:00 UTC (1:00 p.m.

August 9
06:00 UTC (1:00 a.m.

August 10
18:00 UTC (12:00 p.m.

August 11
12:00 UTC (6:00 a.m.

August 12
00:00 UTC (5:00 p.m.
12:00 UTC (5:00 a.m.

August 13
00:00 UTC (5:00 p.m.
06:00 UTC (11:00 p.m.

August 16
00:00 UTC (5:00 p.m.
12:00 UTC (5:00 a.m.
12:00 UTC (5:00 a.m.
18:00 UTC (11:00 a.m.
12:00 UTC (7:00 a.m.
18:00 UTC (1:00 p.m.

August 17
12:00 UTC (5:00 a.m.
12:00 UTC (7:00 a.m.

August 18
00:00 UTC (6:00 p.m.
12:00 UTC (6:00 a.m.
18:00 UTC (12:00 p.m.

August 19
06:00 UTC (12:00 a.m.
18:00 UTC (12:00 p.m.

August 20
18:00 UTC (12:00 p.m.

August 21
18:00 UTC (11:00 a.m.

August 26
06:00 UTC (12:00 a.m.
12:00 UTC (5:00 a.m.
18:00 UTC (2:00 p.m.

August 27
06:00 UTC (12:00 a.m.

August 28
06:00 UTC (11:00 p.m.
12:00 UTC (6:00 a.m.
18:00 UTC (12:00 p.m. MDT) at  Tropical Depression Hernan degenerates to a remnant low just offshore the southern tip of the Baja California peninsula.

August 30
06:00 UTC (12:00 a.m.
18:00 UTC (12:00 p.m.

September 

September 5
00:00 UTC (7:00 p.m.

September 6
00:00 UTC (7:00 p.m.

September 7
00:00 UTC (6:00 p.m.
06:00 UTC (12:00 a.m. MDT) Tropical Depression Julio dissipates.

September 12
18:00 UTC (12:00 p.m.

September 13
06:00 UTC (12:00 a.m.

September 15
00:00 UTC (5:00 p.m.

September 16
18:00 UTC (11:00 a.m.

September 20
18:00 UTC (12:00 p.m. MDT) at  Tropical Depression Seventeen-E forms from a trough that originates on the southern side of the Atlantic's Tropical Storm Beta.

September 21
18:00 UTC (12:00 p.m.

September 23
06:00 UTC (11:00 p.m.

September 25
18:00 UTC (11:00 a.m.

September 29
06:00 UTC (12:00 a.m.
18:00 UTC (12:00 p.m.

October 

October 1
00:00 UTC (5:00 p.m.
12:00 UTC (5:00 a.m.

October 2
00:00 UTC (5:00 p.m.
06:00 UTC (11:00 p.m.

October 3
12:00 UTC (5:00 a.m.

October 4
06:00 UTC (11:00 p.m.
12:00 UTC (5:00 a.m.

October 5
00:00 UTC (5:00 p.m.
06:00 UTC (1:00 a.m.
18:00 UTC (12:00 p.m.

October 6
12:00 UTC (6:00 a.m.
18:00 UTC (11:00 a.m.

October 8
00:00 UTC (6:00 p.m.

October 10
00:00 UTC (6:00 p.m.

October 13
18:00 UTC (12:00 p.m. MDT) at  The remnants of Norbert regenerate into a tropical depression just northwest of Socorro Island.

October 14
00:00 UTC (6:00 p.m.

October 15
00:00 UTC (5:00 p.m.

November 

November 3
18:00 UTC (11:00 a.m.

November 5
00:00 UTC (5:00 p.m.
18:00 UTC (11:00 a.m.

November 17
18:00 UTC (12:00 p.m.

November 18
00:00 UTC (6:00 p.m.
12:00 UTC (5:00 a.m.

November 19
12:00 UTC (5:00 a.m.
18:00 UTC (11:00 a.m.

November 30
 The 2020 Pacific hurricane season ends in the East Pacific and Central Pacific basins.

See also

 Timeline of the 2020 Atlantic hurricane season
 Tropical cyclones in 2020

Notes

References

External links

The National Hurricane Center's advisory archive for 2020

 
Pacific hurricane meteorological timelines
Articles which contain graphical timelines